A Man Called Hoss is a concept album by the American country music artist Waylon Jennings, released on MCA in 1987.

Background
It is a quasi-autobiographical record which chronicles Jennings' life and experiences in ten "chapters", each of which corresponds to a single track on the album; the titles of these chapters are: "Childhood", "Texas", "First Love", "Lost Love", "Nashville", "Crazies", "Drugs", "Jessi", "Reflections" and "The Beginning". Each song was written in collaboration with Roger Murrah, who is given credit on the album's cover. "Rough and Rowdy Days" was Jennings' second-to-last top ten single, reaching #6 on the country charts. The album itself peaked at #22.

He later recalled, "Somebody talked me into doing a narration between the cuts, and I've regretted that part of the album, though it remains one of my favourite records.  If you have to tell somebody the story as you're singing it, you don't have faith in the power of the songs, and the songs didn't need any extra help." 
Jennings performed the album as a one-man show in California and at Duke University.

Track listing
All tracks written by Waylon Jennings and Roger Murrah.

"Prologue" – 3:36
Chapter One – Childhood: "Littlefield" – 2:11
Chapter Two – Texas: "You'll Never Take the Texas Out of Me" – 2:58
Chapter Three – First Love: "You Went Out with Rock and Roll" – 2:21
Chapter Four – Lost Love: "A Love Song (I Can't Sing Anymore)" – 2:39
Chapter Five – Nashville: "If Ole Hank Could Only See Us Now" – 2:53
Chapter Six – Crazies: "Rough and Rowdy Days" – 2:35
Chapter Seven – Drugs: "I'm Living Proof (There's Life After You)" – 3:17
Chapter Eight – Jessi: "You Deserve the Stars in My Crown" – 2:44
Chapter Nine – Reflections: "Turn It All Around" – 2:24
Chapter Ten – The Beginning: "Where Do We Go from Here" – 4:51

Personnel
Waylon Jennings - vocals, electric guitar, backing vocals
Larrie Londin, Eddie Bayers - drums
Jerry Bridges - bass guitar
John Jarvis, Matt Rollings, Barry Walsh - piano
Billy Joe Walker Jr., Gary Scruggs - acoustic guitar
Reggie Young, Gary Scruggs - electric guitar
Mike Lawler - synthesizer
Larrie Londin - percussion
Ralph Mooney - steel guitar
Mark O'Connor - fiddle, viola
Jim Horn, George Tidwell - trumpet
Quitman Dennis - tenor saxophone
Jim Horn - baritone and alto saxophone
Dennis Good - trombone
Technical
Producer: Jimmy Bowen, Waylon Jennings
Art direction: Simon Levy
Cover photography: Matt Barnes

Chart performance

References

Sources

Waylon Jennings albums
1987 albums
MCA Records albums
Albums produced by Jimmy Bowen